Marcus Cole is a fictional character.

Marcus Cole may also refer to:

Marcus Cole (singer), gospel singer
Marcus Cole, hellogoodbye band member
G. Marcus Cole, professor of law

See also
Mark Cole, member of the Virginia House of Delegates
Cole (name)